Ljøtebotnberget  is a mountain located in the municipality of Hol in Buskerud,  Norway.

References

External links
 Ljøtebotnberget (norgeskart.no)

Hol
Mountains of Viken